The 2003 Euroleague Final Four was the concluding Euroleague Final Four tournament of the 2002–03 Euroleague season. The event was held from May 9 until May 11, 2003 and was hosted at the Palau Sant Jordi in Barcelona, Spain. FC Barcelona won their first Euroleague title in their hometown city after beating Montepaschi Siena in the championship game.

Bracket

Semifinals

Third Place

Final

Awards

Euroleague Final Four MVP 
  Dejan Bodiroga ( FC Barcelona)

Euroleague Finals Top Scorer 
  Dejan Bodiroga ( FC Barcelona)

External links 
 2003 Final Four website

Final Four
2002–03
2002–03 in Spanish basketball
2002–03 in Russian basketball
2002–03 in Italian basketball
International basketball competitions hosted by Spain
Sports competitions in Barcelona
International basketball competitions hosted by Catalonia